Valley of the Giants is a 1938 American Technicolor adventure film directed by William Keighley, written by Seton I. Miller and Michael Fessier, and starring Wayne Morris, Claire Trevor, Frank McHugh, Alan Hale Sr., Donald Crisp, and Charles Bickford. It is based on the novel The Valley of the Giants by Peter B. Kyne. The film was released by Warner Bros. on September 17, 1938.

Plot
Bill Cardigan (Wayne Morris) owns a large portion of the California Redwoods. Howard Fallon (Charles Bickford) along with Hendricks (John Litel), Lee Roberts (Claire Trevor), Ed Morell (Jack La Rue) and Fingers McCarthy (Frank McHugh) go to California and try to procure Bill's land. Howard finds out about Bill's large bank debt, and now has a way to get ownership of the forest. Accidentally the claims Howard had towards the land get destroyed in a fire giving Bill a chance to reclaim ownership. Bill must get his lumber cut and shipped within six weeks. Howard attempts to stop Bill by destroying the railroad, damming the river and locking him and Lee in the caboose of the train and sending it towards the destroyed track. Fallon gets captured and surrenders to Bill, giving him back his land.

Cast
 Wayne Morris as Bill Cardigan
 Claire Trevor as Lee Roberts
 Frank McHugh as 'Fingers' McCarthy 
 Alan Hale Sr. as 'Ox' Smith 
 Donald Crisp as Andy Stone
 Charles Bickford as Howard Fallon
 Jack La Rue as Ed Morrell
 John Litel as Hendricks
 Dick Purcell as Creel
 El Brendel as 'Fats' 
 Russel Simpson as McKenzie
 Cy Kendall as Sheriff Grabber
 Harry Cording as Greer
 Wade Boteler as Joe Lorimer
 Helen MacKellar as Mrs. Lorimer
 Addison Richards as Hewitt
 Jerry Colonna as Saloon Singer

Location
The film was shot on locations in Humboldt County, California.

Production
This is the third film version of the 1919 novel with a 1919 film directed by James Cruze and a 1927 remake directed by Charles Brabin. The original film was lost up until 2010 when the film was presented to the Library of Congress by the Russian film archive Gosfilmofond.

Footage from the film was used throughout Warner Brothers' 1952 picture The Big Trees, also in Technicolor. The later film is not a precise remake, but shares useful plot points. The climactic explosion of a logjam makes use of the destruction of the bridge in Valley of the Giants. Costumes were designed to match the images in several scenes, notably when the red-shirted hero in each picture works his way along a train carrying huge cut trees in order to stop the caboose carrying his love interest from plunging into a gorge. The white shirted villain survived his battle with the hero in this picture.  Alan Hale Jr. plays a lumberjack in the later film, wearing a very distinctive outfit—including a hat—like the one his father wears in this picture. The Big Trees uses the long shot from Valley of the Giants of Ox (Alan Hale Sr.) sliding down a cable to have the character played by his son accomplish the same feat.

References

External links

1938 adventure films
1938 films
American adventure films
Remakes of American films
1930s English-language films
Films based on American novels
Films directed by William Keighley
Films scored by Adolph Deutsch
Films set in forests
Films about lumberjacks
Warner Bros. films
1930s American films